The 2015 NRL State Championship was a rugby league match held between the winners of the 2015 New South Wales Cup and the 2015 Queensland Cup. It was the second edition of the State Championship, following the inaugural 2014 edition, and was played on 4 October 2015, as a curtain raiser to the 2015 NRL Grand Final. The Ipswich Jets won the match, defeating the Newcastle Knights 26-12.

Background
For the 2015 NRL State Championship, The Newcastle Knights won the NSW Cup by defeating the Wyong Roos 20-10 in the Grand Final, and the Ipswich Jets won the QLD Cup by defeating the Townsville Blackhawks 32-20 in the Grand Final.

Match details

Teams

See also

2015 New South Wales Cup season
2015 Queensland Cup season

References

External links
2015 Queensland Cup
2015 New South Wales Cup

2015 in Australian rugby league
Newcastle Knights matches
Ipswich Jets
Rugby league club matches